The African Feminist Forum (AFF) is a biennial conference that brings together African feminist activists to deliberate on issues of key concern to the feminist movement. It was developed out of the growing concern amongst feminists on the continent, that the efforts to advance the rights of women on the continent were under serious threat from a number of sources. It took place for the first time in November 2006 in Accra, Ghana, and has subsequently convened in Uganda (2008),  Senegal (2010) and in Harare, Zimbabwe (2016).

The African Feminist Forum Program 
The African Feminist Forum program is organised along clusters which reflect the concerns and priorities of African feminists. Each cluster has two or three Coordinators. The clusters are as follows:
 Crafting an African Feminist Epistemology
 Feminist Perspectives on Sexual and Reproductive health and rights in Africa
 African Feminism: political and economic power; resisting fundamentalisms
 Intersecting-Generations
 Feminist Creative Expression
 African Women's Movements: organizations, structures and capacities
 Confronting violation in women's lives
 Global Feminism and the UN System

Members
 Doo Aphane
 Jessica Horn
 Bisi Adeleye-Fayemi
 Everjoice Win
 Mary Wandia

References

External links 
 

Black feminist organizations
Multicultural feminism
Recurring events established in 2006
2006 establishments in Ghana